John Yule (1812–1886) was a Canadian businessman and political figure.

John Yule is also the name of:
 John Yule (botanist) (1762–1827), a Scottish physician and botanist
 John Yule (California politician) (1833–c. 1888), a Scottish-born American politician